Andrew Coombs is a former Wales international rugby union player. His position is back-row forward or lock forward.

Career
Coombs attended Ysgol Gyfun Rhydywaun, and is a fluent Welsh speaker.  He played for Newport Youth and Pontypool RFC before joining Newport RFC at the start of the 2006–07 season. He made almost 50 appearances for Newport and in August 2008 he was made Newport's club captain, succeeding Dai Pattison who had captained the club for 2 years prior.  He also represented Wales at under-18 level.

Coombs made his debut for the Newport Gwent Dragons regional team in the 2009–10 season.

Coombs retired from rugby in June 2016 due to a nasty knee injury sustained whilst playing against the Cardiff Blues in the championship cup semi final 2015.

International

In January 2013 he was selected in the 35 man Wales squad for the 2013 Six Nations championship.

Coombs made his international debut for Wales as a lock forward in their first match of the 2013 Six Nations Championship against Ireland in the Millennium Stadium on 2 February 2013.

In May 2013 he was selected in the Wales national rugby union team 32 man training squad for the summer 2013 tour to Japan.

Newport RFC Record

International Caps
Played 3, won 2, lost 1, drawn 0

References

External links
Newport Gwent Dragons profile
Wales profile

1984 births
Living people
Rugby union players from Merthyr Tydfil
Rugby union number eights
Welsh rugby union players
Wales international rugby union players
Newport RFC players
Dragons RFC players
People educated at Ysgol Gyfun Rhydywaun